Hervé de Bourg-Dieu (c. 1080 in Le Mans – 1150 in Déols) was a  French Benedictine exegete. He is known particularly for his Commentarii in Isaiam prophetam, on the Book of Isaiah.

Notes

References
Germain Morin, "Un critique en liturgie au XIIe siècle. Le traité inédit d'Hervé de Bourgdieu *De correctione quarundam lectionum+," Revue Bénédictine; 24, 1907, pp. 36–61.
 Guy Oury, "Musique et louange de Dieu d'après Hervé de Bourg-Dieu [c. 1075-1150]". Études grégoriennes; VIII (1967) pp. 15–20.

External links
Schaff-Herzog entry
Manuscript pages

1150 deaths
French Benedictines
French biblical scholars
Year of birth uncertain